The Zorian Quartet was an English all-female string quartet ensemble. It was founded in 1942 by and named after violinist Olive Zorian. It gave the premiere performances of, and made the first recordings of, several compositions for string quartet by English composers, including Benjamin Britten and Michael Tippett. It also gave the premiere English performances of quartets by Ernest Bloch and Béla Bartók.

The original members were Olive Zorian (191665, violin I); Marjorie Lavers (violin II); Winifred Copperwheat (190576, viola); and Norina Semino (cello).

Some sources say that the quartet disbanded in 1949. Other sources say that it continued to perform for at least another ten years. The later date is supported by evidence that the violinist Frances Mason and the cellist Eleanor Warren were members of the Zorian Quartet in the 1950s.

Notable performances and recordings 
 27 March 1943Tippett, String Quartet No. 2; premiere, Wigmore Hall, London; 1947, premiere recording
 3 July 1944Priaulx Rainier, String Quartet in C; premiere, Wigmore Hall
 5 March 1945Doreen Carwithen, String Quartet No. 1; premiere, Duke's Hall, Royal Academy of Music
 23 July 1945Ralph Vaughan Williams, song cycle On Wenlock Edge for voice, piano and string quartet, with Benjamin Britten (piano) and Peter Pears (tenor); Decca 78rpm recording
 21 November 1945Britten, String Quartet No. 2; premiere, Wigmore Hall; 1946, premiere recording His Master's Voice 78rpm C.3539
 1946Henry Purcell, Fantasia upon One Note Z.745 for string ensemble, with Benjamin Britten (second viola); His Master's Voice 78rpm recording C.3539
 19 October 1946Tippett, String Quartet No. 3; premiere, Wigmore Hall
 1948 at the first Aldeburgh Festival: Tippett, String Quartet No. 2; Purcell, The Golden Sonata (Trio sonata in four parts in F major Z.810, realized by Britten); Frank Bridge, Phantasy Quartet, with Britten (piano)

References

External links 
 
 

Musical groups established in 1942
English string quartets
1942 establishments in the United Kingdom
All-female bands